New Orleans Soul is a musical style derived from the soul music which has a large influence of the Gospel (music). New Orleans soul has ingredients of pop music and soul and is influenced by boogie-woogie style. The songs always are accompanied by a piano and a saxophone. This became known, mainly, in the postwar era, in the Crescent City.

This genus stands out for its pop base (what can be seen in the structures of genus) and Rock rhythms that have become very influenced by the "second line" hits, very  popular in the city. The Caribbean music and Latin music from the 60's, that earned a great importance in the city, also inspired to this genre of Soul to develop more exotic rhythms. There are also normal midtempo rhythms. The musicians give more importance to the music and sound that to the letter, which sometimes makes no sense (much like most of this wiki entry). The choir is always feminine, with the participation of one or two women in it.

Origins 
The first songs of this style of Soul emerged from the hand of songwriter and producer Allen Toussaint in 1960. Soon, however, this musical style began to assume great importance among other local and regional authorities. In the nineties, New Orleans Soul attracted the attention of many singers from other genres of soul music, in addition, influences to acquiring the Soul of the South. The success of this genre was originally developed in New Orleans, with little influence outside the city.

Despite this, some musicians from Memphis have named the genre as a major element in the development of Soul of this city. That genre also influenced the Northern Soul and British soul. Around 1965, when the Soul of New Orleans had only five years of operation, Toussaint, the mentioned operator of this kind of Soul, produced a slower version of gender, which caused much of the birth of Funk. The genus was about 24 national success.

Notable artists 
 Irma Thomas
 Dr. John
 Harry Connick, Jr.
 Dave Bartholomew and Fats Domino
 Walter "Wolfman" Washington
 Jessie Hill
 Mahalia Jackson

References

External links 
 Top picks in New Orleans music.

Soul music genres
Music of New Orleans
Music scenes